Cloud 9 is a 2014 American romantic sports drama television film directed by Paul Hoen and written by Justin Ware. It stars Dove Cameron, Luke Benward, Kiersey Clemons and Mike C. Manning. The film is set in the world of competitive snowboarding. The first promo aired on November 29, 2013 during the premiere of "Good Luck Jessie: NYC Christmas". The film premiered on January 17, 2014 as a Disney Channel Original Movie. It was viewed by 4.96 million viewers during its original premiere.

Plot 
Kayla Morgan begins training to win the "Fire and Ice" snowboarding competition alongside her boyfriend Nick Swift, the son of team coach Sebastian Swift. The previous year, a video went viral of famous snowboarder Will Cloud failing to perform a move he created called “Cloud 9,” causing Will to end his snowboarding career and find work at his family's dog kennel. While riding Will’s sled, Kayla crashes into a mountain lodge sign, demolishing it and the sled in the process.

Her parents, Richard and Madeline, offer to fix the sign, but Kayla has to work at the kennel to replace Will’s sled. Will tells Kayla that she only made the team because of her dad’s donations to them. Kayla is later kicked off the team due to the accident. She confronts Nick about his unwillingness to defend her, and Nick eventually admits that she isn’t good enough to win Fire and Ice.

The next day, Will arrives at the kennel with his friends, Dink and Sam. When Kayla overhears Will lecturing Sam about his snowboarding technique, she realizes Will is a more talented snowboarder than he is given credit for. Nick breaks up with Kayla, believing she is distracting him from the competition.

Kayla asks Will to train her for Fire and Ice, offering to remodel the kennel in exchange, but Will refuses. Will says there would be no point since she doesn’t have a team to train with, but Kayla decides to form a team with Will’s old teammates, calling them the Hot Doggers. She then learns that the Swifts have replaced her with famous snowboarder Skye Sailor. Will eventually agrees to train Kayla. Under Will’s guidance, her performance greatly improves, though Nick grows jealous at the budding friendship between the two.

Impressed by the remodeled kennel and grateful towards Kayla for restoring Will’s former passion, Andrea agrees to give the two a day off. While out with Will, Kayla asks him to join the Hot Doggers. The next morning, Kayla overhears her father worrying that she will lose to the Swifts, which strengthens her resolve.

Later, Kayla asks Will to teach her the Cloud 9, but Will says she is not ready. Determined, Kayla takes a helicopter to the top of the notoriously tall Tyson's Peak and bravely snowboards down the mountain, unaware that she is being broadcast on TV from the helicopter. On the way down, she causes an avalanche that buries her under the snow. When Will and Donald rescue her, Kayla admits that she boarded down the peak to impress Will into teaching her the Cloud 9.

After being ridiculed by Nick for taking a fall while boarding, Will finally agrees to teach Kayla the Cloud 9. After a few failed attempts, Nick arrives and tells Will that he would be at fault if Kayla were to injure herself. Will accuses Kayla of being obsessed with winning Nick back, and the ensuing argument culminates in a kiss. Later, Kayla is invited to rejoin the Swifts by Sebastian, and she accepts.

However, Kayla changes her mind and rejoins the Hot Doggers before the competition. Nick wins the men’s title at Fire and Ice, making Kayla the only chance the Hot Doggers have left against the Swift team. Skye delivers an impressive performance, ensuring Kayla can only beat her with a near-perfect score. Right before her round in Run 2, Richard apologizes to Kayla for not believing in her. Nick, tired of the constant pressure from his father, then reveals to Kayla that he was forced by Sebastian to comply in kicking Kayla off the team. Kayla, now more determined than ever to beat the Swifts, decides she will perform the Cloud 9. She successfully lands the Cloud 9, scoring perfect 10 points from all the judges and making the Hot Doggers overall winners of Fire and Ice. Kayla and her friends celebrate her victory, and even Sebastian applauds her, now regretting his decision to remove her from the team.

Cast 
 Dove Cameron as Kayla Morgan
 Luke Benward as Will Cloud
 Mike C. Manning as Nick Swift
 Kiersey Clemons as Skye Saylor
 Amy Farrington as Andrea
 Patrick Fabian as Richard Morgan 
 Carlon Jeffery as Dink
 Andrew Caldwell as Sam
 Dillon Lane as Burke
 Colton Tran as Mike Lamb
 Victoria Moroles as Pia
 Tatum Chiniquy as Linds
 Jeffrey Nordling as Sebastian Swift

Songs
Dove Cameron and Luke Benward – "Cloud 9"
Nikki Flores and Don Benjamin – "Across the Sky"
The PCH Crew – "Never Too Late" (featuring Mayru)
Krankheadz – "I Want It All"
Superchick – "One Girl Revolution"
Meg Contonne, Cut One - "Zoom, Zoom, Zoom"

Broadcast
The film premiered on January 17, 2014, along with the series premiere of I Didn't Do It and a special preview of Win, Lose or Draw.

International release
The film originally premiered on January 17, 2014 on Disney Channel and Family Channel. It premiered on February 20, 2014 on Disney Channel (Israel), on February 28, 2014 on Disney Channel (UK and Ireland), on 
March 23, 2014 on Disney Channel (Southeast Asia), and in mid-2014 on Disney Channel (Australia and New Zealand). Other Disney Channel networks premiered it throughout March and April, with Russia airing it March 1, Italy on March 8, the Eastern European networks on March 15, Spain, Scandinavia and the Netherlands on April 11, France on April 22, and Brazil on May 11. It premiered on June 28 in Australia and on June 26 on Disney Channel (Europe, Middle East and Africa). The movie premiered in Germany in April on Disney Cinemagic.

References

External links
 

2014 television films
2014 films
2014 romantic drama films
2010s sports drama films
2010s teen drama films
2010s teen romance films
American romantic drama films
American sports drama films
American teen drama films
American teen romance films
Disney Channel Original Movie films
American drama television films
Films about women's sports
Films directed by Paul Hoen
Films scored by Alex Wurman
Films shot in Utah
Romance television films
Snowboarding films
Sports television films
Teen sports films
Avalanches in film
2010s English-language films
2010s American films